Legacy of Hate and Lust is the 6th album by Leæther Strip.

Track listing 

 Down There With You
 We Need a Life
 The Darkness Ends the Day
 I Wanna Hate You
 We're Losing Time
 Whisper Your Poetry
 Come Out Tonight
 I Won't Look Back
 I Try - I Die
 No Rest for the Wicked
 13/6 - 1994

1995 albums
Leæther Strip albums